The Milt Gooden House was a historic house in rural White County, Arkansas. It was a single-story double-pen structure, built out of wood framing, and was finished with a side gable roof and board-and-batten siding. A porch extended across its front (eastern) facade, supported by simple square posts. The house was built about 1921, and was a well-preserved example of period vernacular architecture.

The house was listed on the National Register of Historic Places in 1992.  It has been listed as destroyed in the Arkansas Historic Preservation Program database.

See also
National Register of Historic Places listings in White County, Arkansas

References

Houses on the National Register of Historic Places in Arkansas
Houses completed in 1921
Houses in White County, Arkansas
National Register of Historic Places in White County, Arkansas
Buildings and structures in Bald Knob, Arkansas